Ravi Bhargavan is an Indian film director and screenwriter who has worked on Tamil and Telugu films.

Career
Ravi Bhargavan began his career as a director by making a Tamil film titled Well Done (2003) starring newcomers Jayanth and  Chytra Hallikeri. A film critic reviewed the film and wrote "with a flimsy story and unimaginative handling, the director here definitely does not earn a "Well Done" from the viewer".
He next worked on a film titled Kadhal Seiya Virumbu with Santhosh and Srisha, and the film took a low key box office opening, while Sify.com labelled the film as "regressive". Bhargavan then made a romantic drama film, Oru Kadhal Seiveer, featuring Santhosh alongside Archana Galrani. Reviewing the film, a critic from The Hindu stated "this romance puts you off" and that "Oru Kadhal Seiveer is a film with a message that has not been conveyed very well", with "the climax diluting the story". The reviewer added that "director Bhargavan, who is also in charge of the story, screenplay and dialogue, should have avoided certain scenes", concluding that it was a "sordid affair". In 2007, Bhargavan worked on another small-budget bilingual thriller film Thiru Ranga in Tamil and Julayi in Telugu, starring Santhosh again and Ankitha. The film had a low key release in May 2007 and earned negative reviews, with a film critic noting it has "a plot that stretches the limits of credulity and with an uncharismatic cast, it doesn't earn the respect that its name indicates".

His most recent film, the college-based romantic comedy Kadaisi Bench Karthi (2017) starring Bharath in the lead role, is scheduled to release in March 2017. The film revolves around how smart phones jeopardise youngsters in relationships and prior to release, the film garnered attention when Bhargavan refused to edit out adult content.

Filmography

References

Living people
Telugu film directors
Tamil film directors
Telugu screenwriters
1975 births